Fuka Kono (born 15 January 1998) is a Japanese professional footballer who plays as a forward for WE League club Albirex Niigata.

Club career 
Kono made her WE League debut on 12 September 2021.

References 

Living people
1998 births
Women's association football forwards
WE League players
Japanese women's footballers
Albirex Niigata Ladies players
Association football people from Aichi Prefecture